Fundulotrema is a genus of monogeneans in the family Gyrodactylidae.

Species
Fundulotrema foxi (Rawson, 1973) Kritsky & Thatcher, 1977
Fundulotrema megacanthus (Wellborn & Rogers, 1967) Kritsky & Thatcher, 1977
Fundulotrema porterensis King & Cone, 2009
Fundulotrema prolongis (Hargis, 1955) Kritsky & Thatcher, 1977
Fundulotrema stableri (Hathaway & Herlevich, 1973) Kritsky & Thatcher, 1977
Fundulotrema trematoclithrus (Rogers, 1967) Kritsky & Thatcher, 1977

References

Further reading
Luus-Powell, W. J., Mashego, S. N. & Khalil, L. F. (2003). Mormyrgyrodactylus gemini gen. et sp. n. (Monogenea: Gyrodactylidae), a new gyrodactylid from Marcusenius macrolepidotus (Mormyridae) from South Africa. Folia Parasitologica, 50, 49–55.

Gyrodactylidae
Monogenea genera